Vincent Joseph Boveington (3 March 1903 – 1980) was a British rower and author. His name was misrecorded as Victor Bovington. He competed in the men's coxed four event at the 1924 Summer Olympics.

References

External links
 

1903 births
1980 deaths
Date of death missing
British male rowers
Olympic rowers of Great Britain
Rowers at the 1924 Summer Olympics